Ryan Jacob Paevey-Vlieger (born September 24, 1984), better known as Ryan Paevey, is an American model and actor, best known for his role as Nathan West on the ABC soap opera General Hospital.

Early life
Paevey was born in Torrance, California, and was raised in Los Angeles as the son of Les Vlieger and Linda Paevey. Paevey ran track and cross country in high school.

Although Paevey did not plan to go into the entertainment industry, while in high school, he was scouted for modeling, leading to commercial acting. Paevey grew up working in construction with his father and bartending. Although he initially turned down modeling opportunities, he eventually acted on one.

Career
As a model, Paevey worked opposite Katy Perry and Cher. He worked as "body-double" for Robin Thicke for the music video of Thicke's "Sex Therapy." He worked in Christina Aguilera's 2012 music video for "Your Body". He worked for Izod. Paevey worked in a Corona commercial. While working as model, Paevey was encouraged to try acting.

In December 2013, Paevey joined the cast of the ABC soap opera General Hospital in the contract role of Nathan West. The job was Paevey's first series regular role. In October 2014, Paevey joined Extra as a guest co-host. In 2015, Paevey worked as the lead in the Hallmark Channel original movie Unleashing Mr. Darcy, premiering on January 23, 2016. In 2017, he worked on the Hallmark Channel movie Harvest Love. In 2018, he worked in the Hallmark movie Hope at Christmas. In January 2018, Paevey announced his decision to depart General Hospital. In 2019, he worked on the Hallmark Channel films Christmas at the Plaza and A Timeless Christmas.

Personal life
He has a motorcycle he named Lilith. In July 2015, Paevey injured his wrist in a motorcycle wreck.

In 2016, Paevey launched a brand called Fortunate Wanderer, selling custom prints of photography from his travels, hand-made jewelry, and outdoor gear.

His other hobbies include video games, surfing (which he did with his dad as a child), and cooking, and his favorite food is sushi. Paevey speaks some French and Japanese and can read Japanese. Paevey is of Dutch and Indonesian ancestry on his father's side. Paevey is a self-proclaimed "nature boy" Paevey also briefly lived in Harlem. and is very close with his younger sister Kaitlyn.

Filmography

References

External links

21st-century American male actors
American male film actors
American male television actors
Male models from California
American people of Dutch-Indonesian descent
American male soap opera actors
Living people
1984 births